Acıpayam is a town and a rural district of Denizli Province in high country between the Aegean and Mediterranean regions of Turkey. A plain, watered by two reservoirs, known for growing melons and watermelons, on the road between the city of Denizli and Antalya. It covers an area of 1700 km², and the altitude is 895 m. The district has a population of 57,533 of which 13,700 live in the city of Acipayam.

Etymology
The name Acıpayam means bitter almond (payam being a loanword from Persian) in the local dialect, the town was formerly named Garbipayam and Garbikaraağaç.

History
The plain has been settled since 2000 BC, and Hittites were here in 1500 BC, followed by the Ancient Greeks and more civilizations up to the Byzantines and then the arrival of the Turkish peoples. From 1097 the area was in the hands of the Seljuk Turks. Turkish rule was interrupted by the Crusades but afterwards was settled by the Oghuz Turks and eventually was absorbed into the Ottoman Empire.

Climate

Acıpayam today
As well as agriculture some of Denizli's textile industry has spread to Acıpayam too, where there is a cellulose factory. In the past the people would migrate seasonally to pick tobacco or cotton in other parts of Turkey, today this is not necessary.

Places of interest
 Keloğlan Cave - a 145m long cave, open to visitors.

Towns
 Alaattin
 Dedebağı
 Yeşilyuva

Neighbourhoods

 Akalan  
 Akşar
 Alcı
 Aliveren  
 Apa
 Bademli
 Bedirbey  
 Benlik  
 Boğazdere
 Corum
 Darıveren  
 Dodurgalar  
 Eskiköy
 Gölcük
 Gümüş
 Güney
 Hacıkurtlar  
 Hisar
 Karahüyük
 Karahüyükafşarı
 Karaismailler
 Kelekçi
 Kumavşarı
 Kurtlar
 Kuyucak
 Kuzören
 Köke
 Kırca
 Mevlütler
 Olukbaşı
 Ovayurt
 Oğuzköy
 Pınarbaşı
 Pınaryazı  
 Sandalcık  
 Suçatı
 Sırçalık  
 Ucarı
 Yassıhüyük
 Yazır
 Yeniköy
 Yeşildere
 Yolçatı
 Yumrutaş
 Çakır
 Çiftlikköy
 Çubukçular  
 Ören

See also
 Acıpayam (sheep)

References

External links

A local news web site 

Populated places in Denizli Province
Districts of Denizli Province